Bruce D. Mendenhall (born April 14, 1951) is a convicted American murderer and serial killer. He was arrested in Tennessee in July 2007 – and found guilty in 2010 – for the June 26, 2007 murder of Sara Hulbert. The body was found by the security guard on duty that night. A long haul trucker, his truck was found to contain the blood of numerous other murdered or missing women.  He has been charged with the murders of three other women at truck stops in Alabama, Indiana and Tennessee. He is still under investigation for murders in Georgia, Illinois, New Mexico, Oklahoma, and Texas.

Biography
Mendenhall grew up in Crawford County, Illinois. He was married with two daughters.

Arrest
A resident of Albion, Illinois, Mendenhall was arrested at the TA truck stop on Interstate 24 in Nashville, Tennessee on July 12, 2007 after Detective Sgt. Pat Postiglione spotted a truck that matched surveillance footage from the night Sara Nicole Hulbert was murdered at the same truck stop. Upon inspection of the vehicle, a large quantity of bloody clothing and identification and personal effects of an Indianapolis woman, who went missing the day before, was found in a plastic sack along with blood spots scattered around the inside of his cab to include the steering wheel and even on his hands when arrested and Mendenhall was taken into custody. Police catalogued 300 items from the truck including a rifle, knives, handcuffs, latex gloves, several weapons cartridges, black tape, a nightstick, and sex toys. Sampling of these items turned up the DNA of five different women. On August 2, 2007, Mendenhall waived his right to a preliminary hearing.

Victims
Mendenhall's victims were primarily young prostitutes, usually found shot, though detectives have determined that his method of killing may have changed over the years. During questioning, he implicated himself in the shooting death of Hulbert, whose body was found on June 26, 2007. 

He has also implicated himself in the shooting death of Symantha Winters, whose body was found June 6, 2007 in a trash can at a truck stop in Lebanon, Tennessee. She had a criminal record showing at least one previous charge of prostitution. On August 17, 2007, a Wilson County grand jury indicted Mendenhall for the murder of Winters. He was subsequently convicted and sentenced to life.

Another victim killed on July 11, 2007 at a Flying J truck stop on Interstate 465 in Indianapolis, Indiana was recently found. Carma Purpura, a 31-year-old mother of two, was last seen at the far-southside Indianapolis truck stop. On April 10, 2008, Marion County Prosecutor Carl Brizzi charged Mendenhall with murder in the case. DNA tests link a large quantity of the blood from Mendenhall's truck cab to the woman's parents. Investigators also found her cell phone, ATM card and clothing she wore on the day she disappeared. Four years later her remains were discovered just off I-65 in Kentucky.

On July 28, police in Birmingham, Alabama charged Mendenhall with the murder of Lucille "Greta" Carter, who was found nude in a trash bin with a plastic bag taped around her head on July 1. She was shot with a .22 caliber weapon.

Investigators said Mendenhall was initially cooperative, but subsequently ceased to implicate himself in other murders. Police are investigating the possibility that Mendenhall is responsible for other murders in the region including:

Deborah Ann Glover, an Atlanta prostitute whose body was found near a Motel 6 in Suwanee, Georgia on January 29, 2007. Police are certain that Mendenhall was in Georgia on the day Glover was shot.
Sherry Drinkard, a prostitute from Gary, Indiana whose body was found naked in a snow embankment
Tammy Zywicki, a student who was found stabbed to death on September 2, 1992. She vanished from Interstate 80 near LaSalle, Illinois nine days before, after dropping off her brother at Northwestern University.
Robin Bishop, a prostitute who was run over at a Flying J truck stop on Interstate 40 in Fairview, Tennessee on July 1, 2007.
Belinda Cartwright, a hitchhiker who was run over at a truck stop in Georgia in 2001. A composite police sketch made of the suspect based on information from witnesses bears a striking resemblance to Mendenhall.

Until August 2009, Mendenhall was considered in the murder of Jennifer Smith, a prostitute found nude at a truck stop in Bucksnort, Tennessee in April 2005. DNA evidence in 2009 proved that she was the second victim of killer John Wayne Boyer.

References

External links 
 Tennessee Department of Correction; Felony Offender Information Tennessee Offender Management Information System Identification (TOMIS ID): 00465896

1951 births
21st-century American criminals
American male criminals
American people convicted of murder
American prisoners sentenced to life imprisonment
American serial killers
Crimes against sex workers in the United States
Living people
Male serial killers
People convicted of murder by Tennessee
People from Albion, Illinois
People from Crawford County, Illinois
People from Richland County, Illinois
Place of birth missing (living people)
Prisoners sentenced to life imprisonment by Tennessee